Josianne Cutajar (born 27 December 1989) is a Maltese politician who was elected as a Member of the European Parliament in 2019. 

In parliament, Cutajar has since been serving on the Committee on Industry, Research and Energy. In addition to her committee assignments, she is part of the Parliament's delegation for relations with Australia and New Zealand. She is also a supporter of the MEP Alliance for Mental Health, the European Parliament Intergroup on Seas, Rivers, Islands and Coastal Areas and the European Parliament Intergroup on LGBT Rights.

References

Living people
MEPs for Malta 2019–2024
Labour Party (Malta) MEPs
Women MEPs for Malta
21st-century Maltese women politicians
21st-century Maltese politicians
1989 births